Liviu Cosmin Gheorghe (born 2 August 1999) is a Romanian professional footballer who plays as a midfielder for Înainte Modelu.

References

External links
 
 

1999 births
Living people
Sportspeople from Brăila
Romanian footballers
Association football midfielders
Romania youth international footballers
Liga I players
FC Dinamo București players
Liga II players
AFC Dacia Unirea Brăila players
CS Sportul Snagov players
ASC Daco-Getica București players